Falconieri is a surname, and may refer to:

 Andrea Falconieri (1585 or 1586 – 1656), composer
 Vito Falconieri (b. 1986), footballer

Falconieri is an old family from Firenze, Italy:
 Alexis Falconieri (1200 - 1310), priest
 Juliana Falconieri (1270 – 1341), religious
 Lelio Falconieri (1585 – 1648), nobleman
 Orazio Falconieri (d. 1664), catholic cardinal
 Paolo Falconieri (1638–1704), architect and virtuoso